Streuselkuchen ("crumb cake"), also known in English-speaking countries as crumb cake, is a cake made of yeast dough covered with a sweet crumb topping referred to as streusel. The main ingredients for the crumbs are sugar, butter, and flour, which are mixed at a 1:1:2 ratio. The recipe allegedly originated in the region of Silesia, and is popular in German, Polish and Ashkenazi Jewish cuisines.

A streuselkuchen is usually a flat cake made on a baking tray and cut into oblong pieces. The original version uses yeast dough, however a short crust is possible. A puff pastry at the bottom turns it into a prasselkuchen.

Many variants of the cake are prepared with fillings such as fruit (mostly of sour taste, e.g. apples, gooseberries, sour cherries, rhubarb), poppy seeds or creme or using a shortening-based dough.

References

External links 
 
 

Cakes
Ashkenazi Jewish cuisine
German cakes
German words and phrases
Jewish baked goods
Jewish desserts
Silesian cuisine
Polish products with protected designation of origin